Alexander Smart (May 29, 1918 – April 18, 2005) was a Canadian ice hockey forward.  He played one season for the Montreal Canadiens of the National Hockey League and spent the majority of his career in the Quebec Senior Hockey League.

Playing career
Born in Brandon, Manitoba, Smart played junior hockey in the Manitoba Junior Hockey League with the Portage Terriers for two seasons.  In 1937–38, joined the senior ranks with the Toronto Marlboros of the Ontario Hockey Association and scored 23 points in 12 games at a goal-per-game pace.  The following season, he began a three-year stint in the Montreal City Hockey League (MCHL) with the Verdun Maple Leafs and Montreal Sr. Canadiens.

In 1941–42, Smart moved with the Sr. Canadiens to the Quebec Senior Hockey League (QSHL).  Affiliated with the Montreal Canadiens of the National Hockey League, Smart was called up to the NHL in January of the 1942–43 NHL season and, on January 14, became the first player in league history to score a hat trick in his NHL debut; this feat would not be matched for 36 years, by Réal Cloutier at the start of the 1979–80 NHL season, and since repeated by only Fabian Brunnström (2008), Derek Stepan (2010), Ryan Poehling (2019), and not exceeded until Auston Matthews (2016), who scored four.  He completed the season with 5 goals and 2 assists in 8 games – the lone NHL stint of his career.

Smart spent the remainder of his career in the QSHL with the Montreal Royals and Ottawa Senators with the exception of one more season in the MCHL with the Montreal Vickers and the final season of his career in the OVHL with Eastview St. Charles.  He recorded a career-high 66 points in 47 games with the Senators in 1947–48, then helped the club to an Allan Cup in 1949 as Canada's senior amateur champions. Smart retired after the 1950–51 season spent with Eastview.

Post-playing career
After retiring from the QSHL, Smart became a scout for the Los Angeles Kings and worked with Goodyear Tire for forty years.

References

External links
 
 http://ourhistory.canadiens.com/player/Alex-Smart

1918 births
2005 deaths
Canadian ice hockey forwards
Ice hockey people from Manitoba
Los Angeles Kings scouts
Montreal Canadiens players
Sportspeople from Brandon, Manitoba
Canadian expatriates in the United States